Valley Christian Schools is a Christian group of schools in San Jose, California, founded in 1960. Valley Christian's high school and middle school are located at its main campus atop San Ramon Hill in South San Jose, nestled between the Seven Trees and Edenvale neighborhoods, while its elementary school is located in Willow Glen.

Campuses

The school's primary campus, called the Skyway Campus, houses both the high and middle schools, located on top of San Ramon Hill, in South San Jose. It is located at the border of the Seven Trees and Edenvale neighborhoods. The Skyway campus is home to the endangered Dudleya setchellii succulent plant

Valley Christian Elementary School is located in Willow Glen.

History
Valley Christian School was founded in 1960 in Los Gatos, California. In the following years, it relocated to Campbell, California and then to Cambrian, San Jose in 1991, where it was housed at Branham High School.

Construction on a new masterplanned campus began in 1998, atop San Ramon Hill in South San Jose. The new campus opened in 2000.

Valley Christian opened its elementary campus on Leigh Avenue in Willow Glen, San Jose in 2003.

Athletics
The Valley Christian Warriors are members of the West Catholic Athletic League, which they joined in 2003.

Notable alumni
 Aneesh Chaganty, Director/Screenwriter
 Tori Dilfer, professional volleyball player
 Ariel Hsing, table tennis player
 Collin Johnson, NFL wide receiver for the New York Giants
 Kevin Jurovich, National Football League (NFL) wide receiver
 Nikhil Kumar, table tennis player
 Byron Marshall, NFL running back
 Cameron Marshall, Canadian Football League (CFL) running back
 Roger Ver, cryptocurrency proselytizer
 Brianna Visalli, professional soccer player for the  Houston dash
 Joy Williams, singer

References

External links
 

Christian schools in California
High schools in San Jose, California
Private K-12 schools in California
Educational institutions established in 1960
1960 establishments in California